Blabicentrus is a genus of longhorn beetles of the subfamily Lamiinae, containing the following species:

 Blabicentrus bella (Galileo & Martins, 2004)
 Blabicentrus brulei Dalens, Touroult & Tavakilian, 2009
 Blabicentrus capixaba (Martins & Galileo, 1998)
 Blabicentrus ghoutii Dalens, Touroult & Tavakilian, 2009
 Blabicentrus hirsutulus Bates, 1866
 Blabicentrus littoralis Dalens, Touroult & Tavakilian, 2009
 Blabicentrus martinsi Dalens, Touroult & Tavakilian, 2009
 Blabicentrus tomentosus Dalens, Touroult & Tavakilian, 2009

References

 

Desmiphorini